Lindley Township is a township in Mercer County, in the U.S. state of Missouri.

References

Townships in Missouri
Townships in Mercer County, Missouri